Diaphania plumbidorsalis is a moth in the family Crambidae. It was described by Achille Guenée in 1854. It is found in Mexico, Venezuela, French Guiana, Suriname, Bolivia, Peru, and Brazil.

The length of the forewings is 11–14 mm.

References

Diaphania
Moths described in 1854
Moths of North America
Moths of South America
Taxa named by Achille Guenée